Bo Einar "Bosse" Larsson  (2 February 1934 – 12 July 2015) was a Swedish television presenter.

Larsson started working at Sparbanken in Drottninggatan, Stockholm and after that he worked as a janitor. In 1959, he worked as a United Nations soldier in Gaza. From 1960–93 he worked at Sveriges Radio. Beginning in 1965 he hosted Gammeldans från Högloftet at Skansen. His best-known presenting job was on Nygammalt, which he presented between 1971–1989  and Allsång på Skansen 1974–93.

Death
Larsson died from brain cancer on 12 July 2015, aged 81.

Personal life
Larsson married Lisbeth Hansson in 1968.

References

External links

1934 births
2015 deaths
Swedish television hosts
Deaths from brain tumor
Deaths from cancer in Sweden
Place of birth missing
People from Haninge Municipality